The 1878 Timaru by-election was a by-election held on 8 April in the  electorate during the 6th New Zealand Parliament.

The by-election was caused by the resignation of the incumbent, Edward Stafford, who was retiring from politics. He was replaced by Richard Turnbull. As he was the only candidate nominated, he was declared elected. He did not support universal manhood suffrage as proposed by Sir George Grey.

References

Timaru 1878
1878 elections in New Zealand
April 1878 events
Politics of Canterbury, New Zealand